In mathematics, the Askey–Gasper inequality is an inequality for Jacobi polynomials proved by  and used in the proof of the Bieberbach conjecture.

Statement

where

is a Jacobi polynomial.

The case when  can also be written as

In this form, with  a non-negative integer, the inequality was used by Louis de Branges in his proof of the Bieberbach conjecture.

Proof
 gave a short proof of this inequality, by combining the identity

with the Clausen inequality.

Generalizations
 give some generalizations of the Askey–Gasper inequality to basic hypergeometric series.

See also
Turán's inequalities

References

Inequalities
Special functions
Orthogonal polynomials